Under the Pampas Moon, also known as The Gaucho, is a 1935 American Western film directed by James Tinling and starring Warner Baxter and Ketti Gallian. Baxter plays an Argentine gaucho. Rita Hayworth also had an early role in the film. The film has been cited as a "ludicrously dated essay into South American caricature".

Plot
The womanizing gaucho Cesar Campo lives a carefree life on the Pampas. However, when a plane lands nearby he meets an attractive French singer and her unscrupulous fiancée who is so impressed by Cesar's horse that he arranges to have it stolen to enter in a horse race under a false name. Cesar pursues them to Buenos Aires and after a flirtation with the French singer and a series of culture clashes in sophisticated hotels and restaurants he rescues the horse and returns home.

Cast

Warner Baxter as Cesar Campo
Ketti Gallian as Yvonne LaMarr
J. Carrol Naish as Tito
John Miljan as Graham Scott
Armida as Rosa	 
Ann Codee as Madame LaMarr
Jack La Rue as Bazan
George Irving as Don Bennett
Blanca Vischer as Elena
Veloz as Café Dancer – The Cobra Tango 
Yolanda as Café Dancer – The Cobra Tango
Rita Hayworth as Carmen (credited as Rita Cansino)
Tito Guízar as Café Singer
Chris-Pin Martin as Pietro
Max Wagner as Big José
Philip Cooper as Little José
Sam Appel as Bartender
Arthur Stone as Rosa's Father
George J. Lewis as Aviator
Paul Porcasi as Headwaiter
Marie Burton as Maid (credited as Catherine Cotter)
Soledad Jiménez as Soledad Jiménez

Merger of 1935
Fox Film Corporation was run by Sidney Kent from 1930 to 1935. The company was in near bankruptcy in early 1935. It was not making enough money on its films but Sol Lesser Productions made a contract to make films with Fox Film. While on 20th Century Pictures' side, it was making way more gross on the box office than Fox Film. On May 31, 1935, during the making of Fox Film's "Under the Pampas Moon", Sidney announced that the two companies intended merging. Eventually, the same day, they merged to form their biggest success, 20th Century-Fox.

References

External links

 
 

1935 films
1935 Western (genre) films
1930s romance films
American Western (genre) films
American black-and-white films
American horse racing films
American romance films
Films directed by James Tinling
Films set in Argentina
Films set in Buenos Aires
Fox Film films
1930s American films